The Pax Romana (Latin for 'Roman peace') is a roughly 200-year-long timespan of Roman history which is identified as a period and as a golden age of increased as well as sustained Roman imperialism, relative peace and order, prosperous stability, hegemonial power, and regional expansion, despite several revolts and wars, and continuing competition with Parthia. It is traditionally dated as commencing from the accession of Augustus, founder of the Roman principate, in 27 BC and concluding in 180 AD with the death of Marcus Aurelius, the last of the "Five Good Emperors". Since it was inaugurated by Augustus at the end of the final war of the Roman Republic, it is sometimes also called the Pax Augusta. During this period of about two centuries, the Roman Empire achieved its greatest territorial extent and its population reached a maximum of up to 70 million people. According to Cassius Dio, the dictatorial reign of Commodus, later followed by the Year of the Five Emperors and the Crisis of the Third Century, marked the descent "from a kingdom of gold to one of iron and rust".

Overview

The Pax Romana is said to have been a "miracle" because prior to it there had never been peace for so many years in a given period of history. However, Walter Goffart wrote: "The volume of the Cambridge Ancient History for the years AD 70–192 is called 'The Imperial Peace', but peace is not what one finds in its pages". Arthur M. Eckstein writes that the period must be seen in contrast to the much more frequent warfare in the Roman Republic in the 4th and 3rd centuries BC. Eckstein also notes that the incipient Pax Romana appeared during the Republic, and that its temporal span varied with geographical region as well: "Although the standard textbook dates for the Pax Romana, the famous “Roman Peace” in the Mediterranean, are 31 BC to AD 250, the fact is that the Roman Peace was emerging in large regions of the Mediterranean at a much earlier date: Sicily after 210 [BC], the Italian Peninsula after 200 [BC]; the Po Valley after 190 [BC]; most of the Iberian Peninsula after 133 [BC]; North Africa after 100 [BC]; and for ever longer stretches of time in the Greek East."

The first known record of the term Pax Romana appears in a writing by Seneca the Younger in AD 55. The concept was highly influential, and the subject of theories and attempts to copy it in subsequent ages. Arnaldo Momigliano noted that "Pax Romana is a simple formula for propaganda, but a difficult subject for research."

The Pax Romana began when Octavian (Augustus) defeated Mark Antony and Cleopatra in the Battle of Actium on 2 September 31 BC and became Roman emperor. He became princeps, or first citizen. Lacking a good precedent of successful one-man rule, Augustus created a junta of the greatest military magnates and stood as the front man. By binding together these leading magnates in a coalition, he eliminated the prospect of civil war. The Pax Romana was not immediate, despite the end of the civil wars, because fighting continued in Hispania and in the Alps. Nevertheless, Augustus closed the Gates of Janus (a ceremony indicating that Rome was at peace) three times, first in 29 BC and again in 25 BC. The third closure is undocumented, but Inez Scott Ryberg (1949) and Gaius Stern (2006) have persuasively dated the third closure to 13 BC with the commissioning of the Ara Pacis.  At the time of the Ludi Saeculares in 17 BC the Concept of Peace was publicized, and in 13 BC was proclaimed when Augustus and Agrippa jointly returned from pacifying the provinces. The order to construct the Ara Pacis was no doubt part of this announcement.

Augustus faced a problem making peace an acceptable mode of life for the Romans, who had been at war with one power or another continuously for 200 years. Romans regarded peace not as an absence of war, but as a rare situation which existed when all opponents had been beaten down and lost the ability to resist. Augustus' challenge was to persuade Romans that the prosperity they could achieve in the absence of warfare was better for the Empire than the potential wealth and honor acquired when fighting a risky war. Augustus succeeded by means of skillful propaganda. Subsequent emperors followed his lead, sometimes producing lavish ceremonies to close the Gates of Janus, issuing coins with Pax on the reverse, and patronizing literature extolling the benefits of the Pax Romana.

After Augustus' death in AD 14, most of his successors as Roman emperors continued his politics. The last five emperors of the Pax Romana are known as the "Five Good Emperors".

Influence on trade

Roman trade in the Mediterranean increased during the Pax Romana.  Romans sailed East to acquire silks, gems, onyx and spices.  Romans benefited from large profits and incomes in the Roman empire were raised due to trade in the Mediterranean.

As the Pax Romana of the western world by Rome was largely contemporaneous to the Pax Sinica of the eastern world by Han China, long-distance travel and trade in Eurasian history was significantly stimulated during these eras.

Pax imperia: analogous peaces

The prominence of the concept of the Pax Romana led to historians coining variants of the term to describe other systems of relative peace that have been established, attempted, or argued to have existed. Some variants include:

More generically, the concept has been referred to as pax imperia, (sometimes spelled as pax imperium) meaning imperial peace,  or—less literally—hegemonic peace. Raymond Aron notes that imperial peace—peace achieved through hegemony can—sometimes, but not always— become civil peace. As an example, the German Empire's imperial peace of 1871 (over its internal components like Saxony) slowly evolved into the later German state. As a counter-example, the imperial peace of Alexander the Great's empire dissolved because the Greek city states maintained their political identity, and more importantly, embryos of their own armed forces. Aron notes that during the Pax Romana, the Jewish war was a reminder that the overlapping of the imperial institutions over the local ones did not erase them and the overlap was a source of tension and flare-ups. Aron summarizes that, "In other words, imperial peace becomes civil peace insofar as the memory of the previously independent political units are effaced, insofar as individuals within a pacified zone feel themselves less united to the traditional or local community and more to the conquering state."

The concept of Pax Romana was highly influential, and there were attempts to imitate it in the Byzantine Empire, and in the Christian West, where it morphed into the Peace and Truce of God (pax Dei and treuga Dei). A theoretician of the imperial peace during the Middle Ages was Dante Aligheri. Dante's works on the topic were analyzed at the beginning of the 20th century by William Mitchell Ramsay in the book The Imperial Peace; An Ideal in European History (1913).

See also 

 Mos maiorum
 Imperialism
 Succession of the Roman Empire

References

Further reading
 Burton, Paul. 2011. "Pax Romana/Pax Americana: Perceptions of Rome in American Political Culture, 2000–2010." International Journal of Classical Tradition 18.1:66–104.
 Cornwell, Hannah. 2017. Pax and the Politics of Peace: Republic to Principate. Oxford Classical Monographs.   Oxford; New York:  Oxford University Press.
 Galinsky, Karl.  2012.  Augustus: Introduction to the Life of an Emperor.   Cambridge; New York:  Cambridge University Press.
 Goldsworthy, Adrian. 2016. Pax Romana: War, Peace and Conquest in the Roman World. New Haven: Yale University Press.
 Hardwick, Lorna. 2000.  “Concepts of Peace.” In Experiencing Rome: Culture, Identity and Power in the Roman Empire, Edited by Janet Huskinson, 335–368. London: Routledge.
 Lopez, Gennaro. 2002. “Pax Romana/Pax Augusta.” Invigilata Lucernis 24: 97–110.
 Stern, Gaius. 2015. “The New Cult of Pax Augusta 13 BC–AD 14.” Acta Antiqua Academiae Scientiarum Hungaricae 55.1–4: 1–16.
 Yannakopulos, Nikos. 2003.  “Preserving the Pax Romana: The Peace Functionaries in Roman East.” Mediterraneo Antico 6.2: 825–905.

External links

 United Nations of Roma Victrix History: Pax Romana
 Pax Romana Discussion group

Rome
Foreign relations of ancient Rome
History of the Roman Empire
1st century BC in international relations
1st century in international relations
2nd century in international relations
Augustus
1st century BC in the Roman Empire
1st century in the Roman Empire
2nd century in the Roman Empire
Latin political words and phrases
Ancient international relations